The Treaty of La Pointe may refer to either of two treaties made and signed in La Pointe, Wisconsin between the United States and the Ojibwe (Chippewa) Native American peoples. In addition, the Isle Royale Agreement, an adhesion to the first Treaty of La Pointe, was made at La Pointe.

1842 Treaty of La Pointe

By this treaty, the Ojibwa ceded extensive tracts of land that are now parts of the states of Wisconsin and Michigan, specifically the latter's Upper Peninsula.

The Webster-Ashburton Treaty was signed on August 9, 1842, between Great Britain and the United States, officially ending their boundary dispute on what now is the Arrowhead Region of Minnesota, as well as settling other claims. This news did not reach the United States parties to the La Pointe Treaty negotiation. Consequently, the Grand Portage Band, then considered to be in Canadian British territory, was not invited to join the signing of this treaty. It is now considered to occupy territory in the United States.

In 1844, the United States and Grand Portage Band signed the Isle Royale Agreement as an adhesion to this treaty.

As determined subsequently by the United States Supreme Court, the signatory tribes retain hunting, fishing and gathering rights on their former lands in this region. In addition, the Supreme Court held that the treaty obligated the United States to provide reservations for peoples of the signatory bands. For instance, it acquired land in the 1930s for the Bay Mills Indian Community, whose people had historically long been located on Lake Superior in Michigan.

Signatories
The Ojibwe treaty signatories were:

‡Name given in Dakota.

Treaty area boundary adjustments
In Michigan, no boundary adjustments have been made.

In Wisconsin, for regulatory purposes, the southeastern boundaries of the 1842 treaty-area have been adjusted to follow distinct landmarks such as roads and streams. Furthermore, in Wisconsin, with consent of the property-owner and with tribally issued license, all treaty rights of hunting, fishing and gathering may be exercised by the members of the signatory bands.

In Minnesota, no boundary adjustments have been made. The Minnesota Department of Natural Resources have been mainly concerned over hunting regulations as related to this treaty. Minnesota does not acknowledge the 1842 land cession area as giving the tribes privilege over Minnesota's own claim over Lake Superior. Minnesota Department of Natural Resources approved an extension of the 1854 Treaty of La Pointe tribal fishing rights for the Grand Portage Band over a portion of the state's Lake Superior claims.

1844 Isle Royale Agreement

The Isle Royale Agreement is an adhesion to the 1842 Treaty of La Pointe, conducted at La Pointe, Wisconsin Territory on August 20, 1844. Commissioner Robert Stuart again represented the United States. The Grand Portage Band was using the resources on Isle Royale and believed it and they were in British territory.  After boundary clarification was settled via the Webster Ashburton Treaty of 1842, the Grand Portage Band signed the Isle Royale Agreement with the United States as a treaty adhesion. The 1842 treaty signatories re-affirmed their treaty.

‡ Name given in Dakota
Wm. McDonald
Jno. Hulbert
Clement H Beaulieu
Chas. H. Oakes
J Russell
Jas. P. Hays, United States Indian Sub-Agent
Wm. W. Warren, Interpreter

1854 Treaty of La Pointe

The treaty ceded all of the Lake Superior Ojibwe lands to the United States in the Arrowhead Region of Northeastern Minnesota, in exchange for reservations for the Lake Superior Ojibwe in Wisconsin, Michigan, and Minnesota. The signatory tribes retain hunting, fishing and gathering right within this region. The portions left unceded were given claims to the Mississippi Ojibwe.
The Indian reservations established under this treaty are:
 L'Anse with Lac Vieux Desert
 Bad River
 Lac du Flambeau and  Lac Courte Oreilles
 Fond du Lac
 Grand Portage
 Ontonagon and Red Cliff
along with general land grants to the Metis.

Mole Lake and St. Croix Bands lost their federal recognition due to not being included in this treaty.  Mole Lake Band and St. Croix Band's eastern half in Wisconsin re-gained their federal recognition under the Indian Reorganization Act of 1934, but the St. Croix Band's western half in Minnesota are not independently recognized and are considered part of the Mille Lacs Band of Ojibwe.

Signatories
The Ojibwe treaty signatories were:

Notes

External links
Text of 1842 treaty
Summary of the 1844 agreement
Text of the 1854 treaty
Chief Buffalo and Benjamin Armstrong historical website

La Pointe
Ojibwe in the United States
Anishinaabe treaty areas
Lake Superior
Native American history of Michigan
Native American history of Minnesota
Native American history of Wisconsin
Military history of Michigan
Pre-statehood history of Minnesota
Pre-statehood history of Wisconsin
Legal history of Michigan
1854 treaties
1844 treaties
1842 treaties
1850s in the United States